Ada Cecille Perkins Flores (7 September 1959 – 24 May 1980) was a Puerto Rican beauty queen who represented Puerto Rico in the Miss Universe 1978 pageant.

In 1980, Puerto Rico was moved by the media news coverage of her death which resulted from the injuries sustained in an automobile accident in San Juan.

Early years
Perkins, the oldest of three siblings, was born in Ponce, Puerto Rico to Oswald Evan Perkins from San Juan and Ada Flores Sanchez. She received her primary and secondary education at St. John's School in the Condado area and later at the Academia del Perpetuo Socorro in Miramar. She graduated from high school in 1977 and enrolled at the Universidad del Sagrado Corazon where she was studying journalism.

Model and beauty contestant
Perkins was a model who participated in television commercials for various companies, among them: "Chicklets Adams", "Texaco", "Salem cigarette" and for the "INDULAC" (Dairy Producers Industry of Puerto Rico). In 1978, she represented Puerto Rico in the Miss Teen International beauty pageant held in Oranjestad, Aruba. Perkins came in 3rd place.

In May of that same year, Perkins represented the city of San Juan in the Miss Puerto Rico contest and won the title. Miss Puerto Rico is the official national preliminary to the Miss Universe international pageant. Each year the event is held to select the representative from the island to the contest. In the inbox above, Perkins is pictured with the Miss Puerto Rico sash and crown which she was entitled to wear during her reign.

She then traveled to Acapulco, Mexico where she represented Puerto Rico in the first Miss Universe pageant hosted by that country. Margaret Gardiner from South Africa won the title of Miss Universe that was held on July 21, 1978.

In 1979, Perkins crowned her successor to the title, Audrey Teresa López (Miss Mayaguez) in an event which included the presence of actor Erik Estrada.

Death
In 1980, she and her boyfriend, Luis A. Ballester were involved in an automobile accident which occurred while they were traveling to her home in Punta las Marias, San Juan. She died in San Juan, Puerto Rico, as a result of the injuries sustained in the accident. She was buried at the Puerto Rico Memorial Cemetery in Carolina, Puerto Rico.

See also

 List of Puerto Ricans
 Irish immigration to Puerto Rico

Notes

References

1959 births
1980 deaths
Miss Puerto Rico winners
Miss Universe 1978 contestants
People from Ponce, Puerto Rico
Puerto Rican female models
Puerto Rican people of Irish descent
20th-century American women
20th-century American people
Universidad del Sagrado Corazón alumni